Schochet or Shochet is a surname, from the Hebrew word for "ritual slaughterer". Notable persons with that name include:

Aryeh Leib Schochet (1845-1928), Russian rabbi
Avraham Shochat (born 1936), Israeli former politician; twice served as Minister of Finance.
Boruch Meir Yaakov Shochet (born 1955), Karlin-Stolin Rebbe
Chaim Schochet (born 1987), American real estate manager and developer
Ezra Schochet, American rabbi
Jacob Immanuel Schochet (1935–2013), Canadian rabbi
Yitzchak Schochet, British rabbi
Yochanan Shochet, Loitzker rebbe

See also 

Occupational surnames
Hebrew-language surnames